Herian is a village in Shaheed Bhagat Singh Nagar district of Punjab State, India. The village is administrated by Sarpanch an elected representative of the village.

Demography 
As of 2011, Herian has a total number of 212 houses and population of 992 of which 511 include are males while 481 are females according to the report published by Census India in 2011. The literacy rate of Herian is 84.17%, higher than the state average of 75.84%. The population of children under the age of 6 years is 76 which is 7.66% of total population of Herian, and child sex ratio is approximately 900 as compared to Punjab state average of 846.

Most of the people are from Schedule Caste which constitutes 44.66% of total population in Herian. The town does not have any Schedule Tribe population so far.

As per the report published by Census India in 2011, 298 people were engaged in work activities out of the total population of Herian which includes 298 males and 12 females. According to census survey report 2011, 99.33% workers describe their work as main work and 0.67% workers are involved in Marginal activity providing livelihood for less than 6 months.

Education 
The village has a Punjabi medium, girls only upper primary with secondary/higher secondary school founded in 1978. The school provide mid-day meal. The school provide free education to children between the ages of 6 and 14 as per Right of Children to Free and Compulsory Education Act.

Transport 

See also 
List of villages in India

References

External links 
 Tourism of Punjab
 Census of Punjab
 Locality Based PINCode

Villages in Shaheed Bhagat Singh Nagar district